Chunan may refer to:

Chūnan, Kagawa, town in Nakatado District, Kagawa, Japan
Chun'an County, county in Hangzhou, China

See also
 Cheonan, a city in South Korea